Frost Arena is a 6,500-seat multi-purpose arena in Brookings, South Dakota.  It was built on the east side of campus in 1973 and is home to the South Dakota State University Jackrabbits men's and  women's basketball, volleyball, and wrestling teams, replacing the Gymnasium-Armory, built in 1918 and nicknamed "The Barn," which still resides on the westside of campus.  Frost Arena was named after former SDSU basketball coach, Reuben B. "Jack" Frost.

The Jackrabbits men's basketball team have enjoyed a tremendous home court advantage at home, compiling a record of 426–127 (.770) through the 2011-12 season. Likewise, the Jackrabbits women's basketball team also has enjoyed their home court advantage with a 349–92 home record.

Originally featuring 9,500 seats, the facility, part of the Stanley J. Marshall HPER Center (HPER is short for Health, Physical Education, & Recreation and is pronounced 'Hyper'), now seats 6,500 fans for basketball. The arena's attendance record is for the SDSU-Augustana men's game on February 11, 1989, which attracted 9,456 fans.  Renovations in 1992 and 2004 eliminated some of the bench seating and installed individual seats in parts of the arena.  In 2005, an updated scoreboard, sound system, and a new arena floor were installed.

In addition to SDSU athletic and school events, Frost Arena has hosted the 2003 NCAA North Central Regional women's basketball tournament, six NCAA North Central Regional men's basketball tournaments, four NCAA Division II Wrestling National Championships, women's WNIT Tournament action in 2007 and 2008, along with numerous concerts and state basketball tournaments.

The first nationally televised game from Frost Arena was February 18, 2012, as the Jackrabbits men's basketball team took on the Buffalo Bulls on ESPNU.

Designs for a remodel of Frost Arena are in progress.  The remodeled arena is proposed to include suites, premium seating, increased concession areas and more restrooms.  Plans have not yet been finalized, and have not yet been approved by the South Dakota Board of Regents.

See also
 South Dakota State Jackrabbits women's basketball
 List of NCAA Division I basketball arenas

References

External links
 Frost Arena

Sports venues in South Dakota
College basketball venues in the United States
College volleyball venues in the United States
College wrestling venues in the United States
Basketball venues in South Dakota
Indoor arenas in South Dakota
Volleyball venues in the United States
Wrestling venues in the United States
South Dakota State Jackrabbits basketball
Buildings and structures in Brookings, South Dakota
1973 establishments in South Dakota
Sports venues completed in 1973